Ida Amanda "Maxida" Märak (born 17 September 1988) is a Swedish-Sámi joik singer, hip hop musician, actress and activist. Märak is a human rights activist with a special interest in the rights of the Sámi people. She has taken part in protests against the establishment of an iron ore mine in Kallak. In 2014, she recorded the album  Mountain Songs and other Stories along with the bluegrass band Downhill Bluegrass band.

Also in 2014, she took part in the SVT show Sápmi Sessions along with Aki and King Fari Band. In Sveriges Radio's radio theater Dagbok från Gallok she can be heard as an actress and also the producer of the music. Along with her sister Mimie Märak she toured with the concert Under Asfalten ett Fjäll. In 2015, she sang the World Cup song "Love Last Forever" along with music group Mando Diao for the 2015 skiing world cup.

She starred in the film Glada hälsningar från Missångerträsk by Martina Haag, and she has also toured with Giron sámi teáhter.

Märak presented an episode of Sveriges Radio's show Sommar i P1 on 30 July 2015.

In 2016, she played the role of Evelina Geatki, a poetess and Sami activist in the Swedish-French series Midnattssol (aka Midnight Sun and Jour Polaire).

She featured on "Eanan", a song by Canadian EDM/hip-hop group A Tribe Called Red from their album We Are the Halluci Nation.

Discography

Studio albums
 2014: Mountain Songs and Other Stories (with Downhill Bluegrass Band)
 2019: Utopi

EPs
 2016: 1
 2017: 5
 2019: Ärr
 2021: Så mycket bättre 2021 – Tolkningarna
 2022: Arvet

Singles

Notes

References

Living people
1988 births
Swedish women rappers
21st-century Swedish women singers
Swedish Sámi musicians
Swedish human rights activists
Sámi actors